Allopeas gracile, common name the graceful awlsnail, is a species of small, tropical, air-breathing land snail, a terrestrial pulmonate gastropod mollusk in the family Achatinidae.

Distribution 
Allopeas gracile occurs throughout the tropics and subtropics worldwide.

 Hawaii & islands of Polynesia (naturalized)
 West Indies
 southern Mexico
 Central and South America
 Dominica - introduced. First reported in 2009.
 Tanzania

It is also found living in greenhouses in other areas,  as a "hothouse exotic".

References
This article incorporates CC-BY-3.0 text from the reference.

Subulininae
Gastropods described in 1834